Getelands or West Getelands is a South Brabantian dialect spoken in the eastern part of Flemish Brabant as well as the western part of Limburg in Belgium. It is a transitional dialect between South Brabantian and West Limburgish.

The dialect is named after the river Gete. It is an endangered language.

Characteristics
The first person singular pronoun is typically the Limburgish ich, instead of Brabantian/Standard Dutch ik. The diminutive forms are formed as in Limburgish, using the umlaut. In Truierlands (sometimes called East Getelands), the plural is also formed by using the umlaut (  vs.  ), in contrast to Getelands plurals formed the Standard Dutch way (  vs.  ). Both dialects share the lack of pitch accent found in most varieties of Limburgish.

Word accent in the Orsmaal-Gussenhoven dialect shows phonetic features of accent 2 (the dragging tone) of the neighboring West Limburgish dialects.

Phonology

This section shows the phonology of the Orsmaal-Gussenhoven dialect, which is spoken in the Linter municipality. The dialect of Melkwezer has a similar phonology, except for the fact that the diphthong  is realized with a mid onset: .

  is restricted to word-initial position, and occurs only in loanwords from French.
 The exact place of articulation of  varies:
  may be dropped by some speakers.
  has a few possible realizations, none of which are uvular. This stands in contrast to most varieties of Limburgish, where  is a uvular trill or fricative.
 Apical trill  or an apical fricative  before a stressed vowel in word-initial syllables.
 Intervocalically and in the onset after a consonant, it may be a tap .
 Word-final  is highly variable; the most frequent variants are an apical fricative trill , an apical fricative  and an apical non-sibilant affricate . The last two variants tend to be voiceless in pre-pausal position.

He gives no evidence for their phonemic status. As Brabantian dialects are known for both diphthongizing  and especially monophthongizing , the distinction between the closing diphthongs and the monophthongs is ignored elsewhere in the article, with  being used as cover symbols for both.
 Among the long rounded vowels,  before  within the same syllable vary between monophthongs  and centering diphthongs , which often are disyllabic  (with the first portion realized as a closing diphthong). In the same environment,  can be disyllabic . For the sake of simplicity, those allophones are transcribed  in phonetic transcription.
They appear only in a few French loanwords.
  occurs only before alveolar consonants.
 Stressed short vowels cannot occur in open syllables. Exceptions to this rule are high-frequency words like wa  'what' and loanwords from French.

References

Bibliography

 Belemans, R.; Keulen, R. (2004): Taal in stad en land. Belgisch-Limburgs: 25
 Belemans, R.; Kruijsen, J.; Van Keymeulen, J. (1998): Gebiedsindeling van de zuidelijk-Nederlandse dialecten, Taal en Tongval jg 50, 1 online
 Goossens, J. (1965): Die Gliederung des Südniederfränkischen, in Rheinische Vierteljahrsblätter, 30: 79-94.
 Pauwels, J.L.; Morren, L. (1960): De grens tussen het Brabants en Limburgs in België. In: Zeitschrift für Mundartforschung 27. blz. 88-96.
 
 Stevens, A. (1978): Struktuur en historische ondergrond van het Haspengouws taallandschap (Mededelingen van de Vereniging voor Limburgse Dialect- en Naamkunde, Nr. 9). Hasselt

Dutch dialects
Languages of Belgium
Brabant